Fontainebleau High School is a public high school located in unincorporated St. Tammany Parish, Louisiana, United States, north of Mandeville. The school is a part of the St. Tammany Parish Public Schools.

The school serves Abita Springs, Covington, and a small section of Mandeville. It previously served much of Lacombe.

History
It was founded in August, 1994 with 775 ninth- and tenth-grade students.  The school had an estimated enrollment of approximately 2,300 students during the 2008–2009 school year, but was downsized with the opening of the new Lakeshore High School, which was opened with the 2009–2010 school year. 2009 enrollment for Fontainebleau is estimated to be about 1,650.

Fontainebleau's mascot is the Bulldog; the school's motto is Optimus Optimorum, a Latin saying meaning "The best of the best". Its school colors are red and black.

Academics
Fontainebleau High School has been recognized as being among the top public high schools in the state and was listed in the 2009 "America's Best High Schools: Louisiana" article in an issue of Business Week. The school continually scores above local, state, and national averages on standardized tests. The school has continually received the Golden Achievement Award from LSU in recognition of the school's graduating seniors earning high amounts of college credit on LSU's credit/placement exams.

PTA
In 2004 the school was certified as a National PTA Parent Involvement School of Excellence, and was re-certified in 2007.

Athletics
Fontainebleau, a member of District 6-5A as classified by the Louisiana High School Athletic Association (LHSAA).

Championships
In 2011, the girls' volleyball team finished up the most successful season in Fontainebleau history (44–1) with a State Championship, defeating Mount Carmel in the finals.
The school won the state title in girls' soccer in 2004, the first state championship the school has ever won, and was the state runner-up in 2009 and 2017. The team has also appeared frequently in the NSCAA winter soccer regional rankings and has appeared several times in the national rankings. In 2004, the championship winning year, the women's soccer team was ranked 7th in the nation.
The FHS Bulldog Wrestling Team has finished in the top 10 in the state multiple times.

Organizations

Band

The Fontainebleau Band program began with approximately 30 members when the school opened in 1994, it now boasts approximately 200 members.

In 2003, the marching band attended its first marching festival. During the 2005 season the Crimson Band was invited to the Louisiana Showcase of Marching Bands, the largest in the state despite missing a month of rehearsals due to Hurricane Katrina. In the Fall of 2006, the band placed 3rd overall at the Louisiana Showcase and 5th overall in the Fall of 2007. In 2008, the band was named the Reserve Grand Champion at the Louisiana Showcase of Marching Bands. In 2009, the band placed 3rd overall with their show, Carpe Noctum. In 2010, the band once again was named Reserve Grand Champion at Louisiana Showcase with the show City of Scandal: Love and the Mob. In 2011, October 29, the Fontainebleau Crimson Band once again won Reserve Grand Champion at the Louisiana Showcase of Marching Bands, falling short of Lafayette High School by only 2½ points. The band has also been named the Grand Champion of the Northshore Camellia Marching festival in 2007, 2008, and 2010.

The FHS Band program includes: the Marching band and Flag Team, Wind Symphony, Symphonic Band, Concert band, Indoor Percussion, Jazz Ensemble. 

The FHS Band went to their first WGI regionals competition in early 2008. Color Guard took first place in the guard competition with their show "My Funny Valentine", and the percussion ensemble took second place in the percussion competition with their show "Circuitry".

JROTC
LA-944 is an Air Force Junior Reserve Officer Training Corps located at Fontainebleau High School, Mandeville, Louisiana. It was created in July 1994 with an agreement between Fontainebleau High School, the St. Tammany Parish School Board, and the United States Air Force. LA-944 is a cadet-run corps where the members of the Senior Staff make all of the major decisions with little help from the Instructors. LA-944 received the Distinguished Unit Award (DUA) during the 1999–2000 year and the DUA with Merit in the years 2007–2008 and 2010–2011.

Student organizations

Environmental Club
Photography Club
SkillsUSA
TRIO/ SADD Club
FIRST Robotics Competition Team
Quiz Bowl
Bulldog Buddies
World Cultures Club
FHS Growl Yearbook 
The Gazette Newspaper
Sketchbook Club
French Honor Society
Future Business Leaders of America
Student Council
National Honors Society
Spanish National Honor Society
Future Farmers of America
Army Junior Reserve Officer Training Corps
Top Dawg/Little Dawg
Student Government
Spark Club
Animation Club
Interact Club
FHS Writes Writing Club
Key Club
Mu Alpha Theta

Notable alumni
 April Nelson, actress and beauty pageant title-holder ("Miss Louisiana 2015")
 Andrew Tarbell, goalkeeper for Austin FC

References

External links
 Fontainebleau High School

Public high schools in Louisiana
Schools in St. Tammany Parish, Louisiana